Fish Holm is a small island,  east of Mainland, Shetland. It is near the village of Mossbank.

References 

 Shetlopedia

Uninhabited islands of Shetland